

List of countries

Polynesia